Norquay is a town in the Canadian province of Saskatchewan. It was named after John Norquay, premier of Manitoba from 1878 to 1887. It is the administrative headquarters of the Key Saulteaux First Nation band government.

Demographics 

See also 

 List of communities in Saskatchewan
 List of towns in Saskatchewan

Footnotes

External links

Towns in Saskatchewan
Clayton No. 333, Saskatchewan
Division No. 9, Saskatchewan